In algebraic topology, a branch of mathematics, a simple space is a connected topological space that has a homotopy type of a CW complex and whose fundamental group is abelian and acts trivially on the homotopy and homology of the universal covering space. Though not all authors include the assumption on the homotopy type.

Examples

Topological groups 
For example, any topological group is a simple space.

Eilenberg-Maclane spaces 
Most Eilenberg-Maclane spaces  are simple since the only nontrivial homotopy group is in degree .

Universal covers 
Every connected topological space  has an associated universal space from the universal cover  since  and the universal cover of a universal cover is the universal cover itself.

References 
Dennis Sullivan, Geometric Topology

Algebraic topology